Esi Sutherland-Addy is a Ghanaian academician, writer, educationalist, and human rights activist. She is a professor at the Institute of African Studies, where she has been senior research fellow, head of the Language, Literature, and Drama Section, and associate director of the African Humanities Institute Program at the University of Ghana. She is credited with more than 50 publications in the areas of education policy, higher education, female education, literature, theatre and culture, and serves on numerous committees, boards and commissions locally and internationally. She is the daughter of writer and cultural activist Efua Sutherland.

Biography
Born in Ghana as Esi Reiter Sutherland, she is the eldest of the three children of playwright and cultural activist Efua Sutherland and African-American Bill Sutherland (1918–2010), a colonial civil rights activist who went to Ghana in 1953 on the recommendation of George Padmore to Kwame Nkrumah.
She was educated at St. Monica's Secondary School, Mampong and Achimota School (where she met her husband).

She has held various positions at educational establishments in Europe and the US, including as Senior Fellow at the Institute of International Education at Manchester University, UK, and as visiting lecturer at the University of Indiana, Bloomington, USA, the Centre for African Studies, University of Birmingham, UK, and L'Institut des Hautes Etudes en Sciences Sociales, Paris, France.

She served with the Ghana government as Deputy Minister for Higher Education, Culture and Tourism (1986–93) and from 1994 to 1995 as Minister of Education and Culture. She has undertaken studies particularly in the field of education for many international organizations including UNESCO, UNICEF, the World Bank and the Association for the Development of Education in Africa, has held key roles in non-governmental organizations including on the executive board of the Forum for African Women Educationalists (FAWE) and the Mmofra Foundation.

Awards
Sutherland-Addy has been the recipient of several awards, including an Honorary Fellowship of the College of Preceptors, UK (1998), a Group Award by the Rockefeller Foundation (2001 and 2002) for the Women Writing Africa Project, an Honorary Doctorate of Letters from the University of Education, Winneba (2004), and the Excellence in Distance Education Award from the Commonwealth of Learning (2008).

Selected bibliography
Editor
 (Editor) Perspectives on Mythology (Proceedings of a Conference organized by the Goethe-Institut and the Institute of African Studies, University of Ghana, between 21 and 24 October 1997), Goethe-Institut/Woeli Publ. Services, 1999. 
 (Co-editor with Aminata Diaw) Women Writing Africa: West Africa and the Sahel, The Feminist Press at CUNY, 2005. .
 (Co-editor with Anne V. Adams) The Legacy of Efua Sutherland: Pan-African Cultural Activism, Banbury: Ayebia Clarke Publishing, 2007. .
 (With Ama Ata Aidoo) Ghana, where the Bead Speaks, Foundation for Contemporary Art-Ghana, 2008. .
 (Co-editor with Takyiwaa Manuh) Africa in Contemporary Perspective: A Textbook for Undergraduate Students. Ghana: Sub-Saharan Publishers, 2013. .
Papers
 "Gender Equity in Junior and Senior Secondary Education in Sub-Saharan Africa", World Bank Publications, The World Bank, number 6500, November 2008.
 "Women, Intangible Heritage and Development: Perspectives from the African Region", ICH UNESCO.

Further reading
 Sutherland-Addy, E. (2018). "Ama Ata Aidoo in Conversation with Esi Sutherland-Addy" (2017). Obsidian: Literature in the African Diaspora, 44(2), 124+.
 Sharma, Veena, and Esi Sutherland-Addy. "A Conversation with Esi Sutherland-Addy", India International Centre Quarterly, vol. 38, no. 1, 2011, pp. 124–133.

References

External links
 “Efua Sutherland-Addy, Associate Professor, Institute of African Studies
 "ESI SUTHERLAND ADDY PERSONALITY - PROFILE FRIDAY ON JOYNEWS (14-3-14)". My JoyOnline, 14 March 2014. YouTube.
 ". Esi Sutherland-Addy – The Executive Lounge on JoyNews (2-8-19)". JoyNews, 2 August 2019.

Living people
Ghanaian women writers
Academic staff of the University of Ghana
Alumni of Achimota School
20th-century Ghanaian women writers
20th-century Ghanaian writers
Ghanaian women academics
Year of birth missing (living people)